Bowes Branch is a  long 2nd order tributary to the Hyco River in Halifax County, Virginia.  This is the only stream of this name in the United States.

Course
Bowes Branch rises about 0.25 miles northeast of Bethel Hill, North Carolina, and then flows generally north into Halifax County, Virginia to join the Hyco River about 2 east of Harmony.

Watershed
Bowes Branch drains  of area, receives about 46.0 in/year of precipitation, has a wetness index of 368.69, and is about 73% forested.

References

Rivers of North Carolina
Rivers of Virginia
Rivers of Halifax County, Virginia
Rivers of Person County, North Carolina
Tributaries of the Roanoke River